Guilty Gear Judgment is a 2006 fighting/Beat em up video game developed by Arc System Works and published by Majesco and Sega for the PlayStation Portable handheld game console  as an entry in the Guilty Gear franchise.

Gameplay

Guilty Gear Judgment consists of a port of Guilty Gear X2 #Reload and features a new side-scrolling single-player mode.

Plot

Development and release

Majesco announced it for a spring 2006 release on January 30, 2006.

Reception

Guilty Gear Judgment holds an average score of 74% on GameRankings and 77 out of 100 on Metacritic.

It was nominated for Best of E3 2006 by IGN. GameZone gave it praise as potentially being one of the "hottest" PSP fighting games.

References

External links

Majesco Entertainment page
Guilty Gear Judgment at MobyGames

2006 video games
Arc System Works games
Guilty Gear games
Multiplayer and single-player video games
PlayStation Portable games
PlayStation Portable-only games
Side-scrolling beat 'em ups
Video games developed in Japan